Herbert Pugh (fl. 1758–1788) was an Irish landscape-painter.

Life 
Pugh was born in Ireland, and came to London about 1758. He lived in the Piazza, Covent Garden. He drank to the detriment of his health, and died soon after 1788.

Works 

Pugh was a contributor to the first exhibition of the Society of Artists in 1760, sending a ‘Landscape with Cattle.’ In 1765 he gained a premium at the Society of Arts, and in 1766 was a member of the newly incorporated Society of Artists. He continued exhibiting with them up to 1776. He tried his hand at some pictures in the manner of William Hogarth, but without great success, although some of these pictures were engraved.

A large landscape by Pugh went to the Lock Hospital. Two views of London Bridge by him were in the Century of British Art exhibition at the Grosvenor Gallery in 1888.

Notes 

 Attribution

External links

Irish landscape painters
18th-century Irish painters
Irish male painters
Irish emigrants to Great Britain